The 2016–17 Lipscomb Bisons women's basketball team represented Lipscomb University in the 2016–17 NCAA Division I women's basketball season. The Bisons, led by fifth year head coach Greg Brown, played their home games at Allen Arena and were members of the Atlantic Sun Conference. They finished the season 6–24, 3–11 in A-Sun play to finish in a tie for sixth place. They lost in the quarterfinals of A-Sun Tournament to Jacksonville.

Media
All home games and conference road will be shown on ESPN3 or A-Sun. TV. Non conference road games will typically be available on the opponents website.

Roster

Schedule

|-
!colspan=9 style="background:#; color:white;"|Exhibition

|-
!colspan=9 style="background:#; color:white;"| Non-conference regular season

|-
!colspan=9 style="background:#; color:white;"| Atlantic Sun regular season

|-
!colspan=9 style="background:#; color:white;"| Atlantic Sun Women's Tournament

See also
 2016–17 Lipscomb Bisons men's basketball team

References

Lipscomb
Lipscomb Bisons women's basketball seasons